is a 2003 fighting game produced by Playmore (now SNK) for the Neo Geo arcade and home platform. It was then later ported to the PlayStation 2 and Xbox, although only the Xbox port was released in North America and both platforms were released in Japan and PAL regions.

It was the third arcade game in a series of crossovers between these two companies (see SNK vs. Capcom series) and the second developed by SNK (SNK previously produced SNK vs. Capcom: The Match of the Millennium for the Neo Geo Pocket Color).

Plot 
In a post-apocalyptic future where civilization is scarce and desolate, both famous fighting tournament rosters such as the Garcia Financial Clique (SNK) and the Masters Foundation (Capcom) are under an end-times crisis; a majority of fighters have been deceased, a minority of them went missing, and only 30 surviving fighters (counting out Athena, Red Arremer, and the four evil clones) of the small total are still at large while locked in a war between Order and Chaos to decide the fate of the universe, whoever wins will return back to their centuries peacefully.

Gameplay 

The gameplay is based on the KOF series (particularly The King of Fighters 2002), with the same four button configuration and many of the same techniques. However, the game does not use the Team Battle format, but follows the traditional round-based one-on-one format. Each match begins with a dialogue exchange between the player's character and the opponent. One new technique introduced in the game is the Front Grand Step, which allows the player to cancel attacks with a forward dash. The player can perform this technique while guarding from an opponent's attack, which will consume one Power Gauge level.

The game uses a different type of Power Gauge known as the Groove Power Gauge System, which has three levels. The Groove gauge fills as the player lands attacks against the opponents or guard attacks. When the gauge fills to Lv. 1 or Lv. 2, the player can perform Super Special Moves, a Guard Cancel Attack or a Guard Cancel Front Step maneuver. When the gauge is full, its reaches MAXIMUM level and a MAX Activation occurs. During MAX Activation, the gauge will change into a timer and the player gains the ability to cancel any of their moves anytime (in addition to Super Special Moves and Guard Cancels). Once the timer runs out, the gauge returns to Lv. 2.

In addition to the regular Super Special Move, each character also has an 'Exceed' move which can only be performed once when the player's life is less than half.

Characters 

This crossover features a total of 36 fighters primarily from both SNK and Capcom's respective fighting game sequels such as The King of Fighters '96 and Super Street Fighter II Turbo, alongside additional character appearances from Samurai Shodown, Art of Fighting, Metal Slug 2, Athena, Darkstalkers, Final Fight, Mega Man Zero, Ghosts 'n Goblins, and Red Earth.

Playable characters

SNK side

Capcom side

Scrapped characters 
Dante: According to Falcoon, an artist who worked for SNK Playmore during the development of this game, the Devil May Cry protagonist was intended to be a hidden character during the very early planning stages, but then became rejected from the roster in favor of Demitri Maximoff, because the designers felt that he would be a more-fitting rival to Leopold Goenitz.
King: Some unused intro sprites of Ryo suggest that she may have been planned to be in this game much like in the previous Capcom vs SNK entries. King was scrapped in favor for Kasumi Todoh, wanting a diverse roster with one character that represents Art of Fighting 3 (1996), alongside Takuma Sakazaki representing Art of Fighting 2 (1994), as well as Ryo Sakazaki representing Art of Fighting (1992).

Notes

Merchandise 
An eight-volume graphic novel series of translated Chinese manhua was published in the U.S. by DrMaster Publications Inc., originally created by Happy Comics Ltd.

Reception 

SNK vs. Capcom: SVC Chaos has received mixed reception, such as the rushed and bland presentation of the game (as seen in stages with very few colors and devoid of "life"), and the low resolution of the Neo Geo (320 × 240) made the game's visuals considerably rough considering the game's 2003 release. The PlayStation 2 and Xbox versions received "mixed" reviews according to the review aggregation website Metacritic.  In Japan, Famitsu gave the PS2 version a score of three sixes and one seven for a total of 25 out of 40.

In 2012, Complex ranked it as the 14th best SNK fighting game ever made, adding that "the game’s secret characters (Firebrand, Mars People, Zero, etc.) had to be the best part about this game," as well as newly animated sprites (Demitri, Earthquake, Tessa, etc.) But was also criticized by others due to the lack of certain "token" characters (like Haohmaru, Benimaru, Zangief, etc.), and the omission of the selectable fighting styles showcased by Capcom, instead featuring only one-on-one modes with extended vital gauges, not giving any choice to players who favored other styles, even those created by SNK itself.

References

External links 
 
 SNK vs. Capcom: SVC Chaos at GameFAQs
 SNK vs. Capcom: SVC Chaos at Giant Bomb
 SNK vs. Capcom: SVC Chaos at Killer List of Videogames
 SNK vs. Capcom: SVC Chaos at MobyGames

2003 video games
Arcade video games
Crossover fighting games
Fighting games
2D fighting games
Neo Geo games
PlayStation 2 games
SNK Playmore games
SNK vs. Capcom
Video games developed in Japan
Video games scored by Masahiko Hataya
Xbox games
UTV Ignition Games games
Multiplayer and single-player video games